, also known as KAB, is a Japanese broadcast network affiliated with the ANN. Their headquarters are located in Kumamoto Prefecture.

History

Pre-launch 
In the 1980s, following the Ministry of Post's (currently Ministry of Internal Affairs and Communications) policy of making four well-known private TV stations accessible nationwide, Kumamoto Prefecture was allocated the fourth private TV broadcaster in 1984, and attracted 482 applicants (215 of which belonged to the Asahi Shimbun Group) to apply. In 1986, the Ministry of Posts commissioned the Kumamoto Prefectural Government to consolidate the applications. After nearly 2 years of the consolidated applications, the other companies agreed to integrate into one for application. 
On October 5, 1988, before the opening of the station, the name of the station was decided as Kumamoto Asahi Broadcasting. A month later, they have obtained a preliminary license and a day before its opening, a general meeting was held. In July 1989, KAB moved into the Technology Plaza Building in Hanabata-cho, Kumamoto City, and started testing TV broadcasts on August 15. On September 22, KAB was granted an official license and started another trial broadcasts.

Launch and further developments 
On October 1, 1989, KAB started broadcasting, becoming the fourth station in the Prefecture (TV Asahi/ANN programming aired from RKK & TKU also moved into the new station). On its second year, it started broadcasting the Kumamoto Prefecture qualifiers of the Japan High School Baseball Championship. In 1991, when Kumamoto Prefecture was hit by Typhoon Mireille, some of its relay stations were damaged forcing to go off air.
2006 December 1: the network's Kumamoto main station commenced their Digital terrestrial television broadcasting service.

Stations

Analog Stations
Kumamoto(Main Station) JOZI-TV 16ch
Hitoyoshi 36ch
Minamata 32ch
Ushibuka 20ch
Oguni 23ch
Aso 50ch
Matsubase 52ch
Misumi 17ch
Amakusa 31ch

Digital Stations(ID:5)
Kumamoto(Main Station) JOZI-DTV 49ch

Programs

Rival Stations
RKK Kumamoto Broadcasting - JNN affiliated, ID:3
Kumamoto Kenmin Televisions - NNN affiliated, ID:4
TV Kumamoto - FNN affiliated, ID:8

References

External links
Kumamoto Asahi Broadcasting 

All-Nippon News Network
Asahi Shimbun Company
Television stations in Japan
Television channels and stations established in 1989
Mass media in Kumamoto